David Ananou (1917–2000) was a writer from Togo, and the author of Le Fils du fétiche.

References

1917 births
2000 deaths
Togolese writers
20th-century Togolese writers